Bissegem is a sub-municipality of the city of Kortrijk, Belgium. It is part of the urban area of this city. As of 2020 it had a population of 5,283.

It also has a railway station, with trains to leper, Kortrijk, Dendermonde, Sint-Niklaas and Brussels.

Gallery

References

Sub-municipalities of Kortrijk
Populated places in West Flanders